The 1996–97 NBA season was the Bulls' 31st season in the National Basketball Association. The Bulls entered the season as defending NBA champions, having defeated the Seattle SuperSonics in the 1996 NBA Finals in six games, winning their fourth NBA championship. During the off-season, the Bulls signed 43-year old free agent All-Star center Robert Parish, who won three championships with the Boston Celtics in the 1980s. Coming off of one of the greatest seasons in NBA history, the Bulls, on the backs of recording another first-place finish in their division and conference, repeated as NBA champions. The Bulls were led by Michael Jordan, perennial All-Star small forward Scottie Pippen, and rebound ace Dennis Rodman, with the former two (Jordan and Pippen) both being selected for the 1997 NBA All-Star Game, in which Jordan recorded the first triple-double in an All-Star Game (14 points, 11 rebounds and 11 assists). Other notable players on the club's roster that year were clutch-specialist Croatian Toni Kukoč, and sharp-shooting point guard Steve Kerr.

The Bulls got off to a fast start winning their first twelve games, while posting a 42–6 record before the All-Star break. During the final month of the regular season in early April, the team signed free agent Brian Williams, who previously played for the Los Angeles Clippers last season, and spent most of the 1996–97 season as a free agent. Williams played in the final nine games of the season as a backup center for the Bulls. Though, the Bulls look to make history against the New York Knicks in their final regular season game of the year, Pippen missed a game-winning 3 and they finished with a 69–13 record, just missing out on becoming the first team in NBA history to have back-to-back 70 wins seasons. The Bulls had the fourth best team defensive rating in the NBA.

Jordan led the league in scoring once again, averaging 29.6 points, 5.9 rebounds, 4.3 assists and 1.7 steals per game, while being named to the All-NBA First Team, and NBA All-Defensive First Team. In addition, Pippen averaged 20.2 points, 6.5 rebounds, 5.7 assists and 1.9 steals per game, while Rodman led the league with 16.1 rebounds per game, but only played 55 games due to suspensions and injuries, such as serving an 11-game suspension for kicking a cameraman during a road game against the Minnesota Timberwolves on January 15, 1997, and a knee injury which cost him to miss the final 13 games of the regular season. Kukoč provided scoring off the bench, averaging 13.2 points per game, but only played 57 games due to a foot injury, while Luc Longley provided the team with 9.1 points and 5.6 rebounds per game, Kerr contributed 8.1 points per game off the bench, while shooting .464 in three-point field goal percentage, second-year forward Jason Caffey averaged 7.3 points and 4.0 rebounds per game, starting at power forward in a few games during Rodman's suspension, and Ron Harper contributed 6.3 points and 2.5 assists per game. Jordan also finished in second place in Most Valuable Player voting, while Pippen finished in fourth place in Defensive Player of the Year voting, while Jordan finished in fifth place, and Kukoč finished in second place in Sixth Man of the Year voting. Kerr also won the Three-Point Shootout during the All-Star Weekend in Cleveland.

In the playoffs, the Bulls would sweep the Washington Bullets in three straight games in the Eastern Conference First Round. In the Eastern Conference Semi-finals, they defeated the Atlanta Hawks in five games, despite losing Game 2 at the United Center, 103–95. In the Eastern Conference Finals, they defeated the Miami Heat in five games to advance to the NBA Finals, where they defeated regular season MVP Karl Malone, John Stockton and the Utah Jazz in six games for their fifth title in seven years.

Following the season, Parish retired after 21 seasons in the NBA, while Williams signed as a free agent with the Detroit Pistons, and Dickey Simpkins was traded to the Golden State Warriors.

Offseason

NBA draft

Roster

Regular season

Season standings

Record vs. opponents

Game log

Regular season

|- style="background:#cfc;"
| 1
| November 1
| @ Boston
| W 107–98
| Michael Jordan (30)
| Dennis Rodman (13)
| Toni Kukoč (7)
| FleetCenter18,624
| 1–0
|- style="background:#cfc;"
| 2
| November 2
| Philadelphia
| W 115–86
| Michael Jordan (27)
| Dennis Rodman (12)
| Scottie Pippen (9)
| United Center24,040
| 2–0
|- style="background:#cfc;"
| 3
| November 5
| Vancouver
| W 96–73
| Michael Jordan (22)
| Dennis Rodman (19)
| Scottie Pippen (8)
| United Center23,726
| 3–0
|- style="background:#cfc;"
| 4
| November 6
| @ Miami
| W 106–100
| Michael Jordan (50)
| Dennis Rodman (22)
| Scottie Pippen (5)
| Miami Arena15,200
| 4–0
|- style="background:#cfc;"
| 5
| November 8
| @ Detroit
| W 98–80
| 3 players tied (16)
| Dennis Rodman (20)
| Michael Jordan (8)
| The Palace of Auburn Hills21,454
| 5–0
|- style="background:#cfc;"
| 6
| November 9
| Boston
| W 104–92
| Michael Jordan (27)
| Scottie Pippen (12)
| Scottie Pippen (11)
| United Center23,813
| 6–0
|- style="background:#cfc;"
| 7
| November 11
| Phoenix
| W 97–79
| Michael Jordan (26)
| Dennis Rodman (22)
| Scottie Pippen (7)
| United Center23,807
| 7–0
|- style="background:#cfc;"
| 8
| November 13
| Miami
| W 103–71
| Michael Jordan (28)
| Dennis Rodman (19)
| Brown & Kukoč (4)
| United Center23,889
| 8–0
|- style="background:#cfc;"
| 9
| November 15
| @ Charlotte
| W 110–87
| Michael Jordan (38)
| Dennis Rodman (17)
| Scottie Pippen (7)
| Charlotte Coliseum24,042
| 9–0
|- style="background:#cfc;"
| 10
| November 16
| Atlanta
| W 97–69
| Michael Jordan (25)
| Dennis Rodman (15)
| Scottie Pippen (7)
| United Center23,939
| 10–0
|- style="background:#cfc;"
| 11
| November 20
| @ Phoenix
| W 113–99
| Jordan & Pippen (37)
| Dennis Rodman (16)
| Scottie Pippen (7)
| America West Arena19,023
| 11–0
|- style="background:#cfc;"
| 12
| November 21
| @ Denver
| W 110–92
| Michael Jordan (31)
| 3 players tied (7)
| Pippen & Rodman (5)
| McNichols Sports Arena17,171
| 12–0
|- style="background:#fcc;"
| 13
| November 23
| @ Utah
| L 100–105
| Michael Jordan (44)
| Dennis Rodman (10)
| Michael Jordan (4)
| Delta Center19,911
| 12–1
|- style="background:#cfc;"
| 14
| November 25
| @ L.A. Clippers
| W 88–84
| Michael Jordan (40)
| Dennis Rodman (14)
| Kukoč & Pippen (4)
| Los Angeles Memorial Sports Arena16,144
| 13–1
|- style="background:#cfc;"
| 15
| November 29
| @ Dallas
| W 116–97
| Michael Jordan (36)
| Dennis Rodman (19)
| Toni Kukoč (6)
| Reunion Arena18,042
| 14–1
|- style="background:#cfc;"
| 16
| November 30
| @ San Antonio
| W 97–88
| Michael Jordan (35)
| Dennis Rodman (14)
| Scottie Pippen (8)
| Alamodome37,058
| 15–1

|- style="background:#cfc;"
| 17
| December 3
| @ Milwaukee
| W 107–104
| Michael Jordan (40)
| Dennis Rodman (12)
| Jordan & Pippen (6)
| Bradley Center18,717
| 16–1
|- style="background:#cfc;"
| 18
| December 5
| L.A. Clippers
| W 114–96
| Scottie Pippen (25)
| Dennis Rodman (14)
| Toni Kukoč (12)
| United Center23,687
| 17–1
|- style="background:#fcc;"
| 19
| December 7
| Miami
| L 80–83
| Michael Jordan (37)
| Dennis Rodman (18)
| Scottie Pippen (5)
| United Center23,861
| 17–2
|- style="background:#fcc;"
| 20
| December 8
| @ Toronto
| L 89–97
| Scottie Pippen (28)
| Dennis Rodman (11)
| Michael Jordan (8)
| SkyDome33,385
| 17–3
|- style="background:#cfc;"
| 21
| December 11
| Minnesota
| W 103–86
| Michael Jordan (27)
| Scottie Pippen (9)
| Scottie Pippen (8)
| United Center23,505
| 18–3
|- style="background:#cfc;"
| 22
| December 13
| @ New Jersey
| W 113–92
| Michael Jordan (32)
| Bill Wennington (8)
| Jordan & Pippen (6)
| Continental Airlines Arena20,049
| 19–3
|- style="background:#cfc;"
| 23
| December 14
| Charlotte
| W 87–82
| Michael Jordan (29)
| Dennis Rodman (23)
| Jordan & Pippen (5)
| United Center23,771
| 20–3
|- style="background:#cfc;"
| 24
| December 17
| L.A. Lakers
| W 129–123 (OT)
| Scottie Pippen (35)
| Dennis Rodman (18)
| Scottie Pippen (6)
| United Center23,919
| 21–3
|- style="background:#cfc;"
| 25
| December 19
| @ Charlotte
| W 93–72
| Michael Jordan (35)
| Dennis Rodman (14)
| Dennis Rodman (5)
| Charlotte Coliseum24,042
| 22–3
|- style="background:#cfc;"
| 26
| December 21
| @ Philadelphia
| W 111–105
| Michael Jordan (31)
| Dennis Rodman (18)
| Scottie Pippen (7)
| CoreStates Center20,918
| 23–3
|- style="background:#cfc;"
| 27
| December 23
| New Jersey
| W 113–81
| Michael Jordan (24)
| Dennis Rodman (17)
| Toni Kukoč (5)
| United Center23,601
| 24–3
|- style="background:#cfc;"
| 28
| December 25
| Detroit
| W 95–83
| Scottie Pippen (27)
| Dennis Rodman (22)
| Kukoč & Pippen (8)
| United Center23,744
| 25–3
|- style="background:#fcc;"
| 29
| December 26
| @ Atlanta
| L 103–108
| Michael Jordan (34)
| Parish & Rodman (10)
| Ron Harper (4)
| Omni Coliseum16,378
| 25–4
|- style="background:#cfc;"
| 30
| December 28
| Cleveland
| W 102–97
| Michael Jordan (45)
| Dennis Rodman (16)
| Scottie Pippen (6)
| United Center23,792
| 26–4
|- style="background:#cfc;"
| 31
| December 30
| Indiana
| W 81–79
| Michael Jordan (28)
| Dennis Rodman (21)
| Scottie Pippen (5)
| United Center23,692
| 27–4

|- style="background:#cfc;"
| 32
| January 3
| Orlando
| W 110–89
| Michael Jordan (22)
| Dennis Rodman (22)
| Ron Harper (7)
| United Center23,904
| 28–4
|- style="background:#cfc;"
| 33
| January 6
| Utah
| W 102–89
| Scottie Pippen (24)
| Dennis Rodman (16)
| Toni Kukoč (6)
| United Center23,904
| 29–4
|- style="background:#cfc;"
| 34
| January 10
| @ Milwaukee
| W 116–101
| Michael Jordan (33)
| Dennis Rodman (26)
| 3 players tied (5)
| Bradley Center18,717
| 30–4
|- style="background:#cfc;"
| 35
| January 11
| Houston
| W 110–86
| Michael Jordan (32)
| Dennis Rodman (18)
| Jordan & Pippen (7)
| United Center24,196
| 31–4
|- style="background:#cfc;"
| 36
| January 14
| Washington
| W 108–107
| Michael Jordan (39)
| Dennis Rodman (18)
| Scottie Pippen (8)
| United Center23,891
| 32–4
|- style="background:#cfc;"
| 37
| January 15
| @ Minnesota
| W 112–102
| Scottie Pippen (29)
| Dennis Rodman (15)
| Toni Kukoč (7)
| Target Center20,113
| 33–4
|- style="background:#cfc;"
| 38
| January 17
| Milwaukee
| W 100–73
| Jordan & Kukoč (24)
| Luc Longley (8)
| Michael Jordan (11)
| United Center23,898
| 34–4
|- style="background:#fcc;"
| 39
| January 19
| @ Houston
| L 86–102
| Michael Jordan (26)
| Michael Jordan (14)
| Scottie Pippen (7)
| The Summit16,285
| 34–5
|- style="background:#cfc;"
| 40
| January 21
| New York
| W 88–87
| Michael Jordan (51)
| Scottie Pippen (10)
| Scottie Pippen (9)
| United Center23,902
| 35–5
|- style="background:#cfc;"
| 41
| January 23
| @ Cleveland
| W 87–71
| Michael Jordan (32)
| Scottie Pippen (12)
| Scottie Pippen (8)
| Gund Arena20,562
| 36–5
|- style="background:#cfc;"
| 42
| January 25
| Toronto
| W 110–98
| Michael Jordan (24)
| Jason Caffey (6)
| Toni Kukoč (13)
| United Center23,913
| 37–5
|- style="background:#cfc;"
| 43
| January 28
| @ Vancouver
| W 111–96
| Michael Jordan (28)
| Scottie Pippen (10)
| Toni Kukoč (11)
| General Motors Place19,193
| 38–5
|- style="background:#cfc;"
| 44
| January 30
| @ Sacramento
| W 111–93
| Michael Jordan (32)
| Luc Longley (11)
| Kukoč & Pippen (6)
| ARCO Arena17,317
| 39–5
|- style="background:#cfc;"
| 45
| January 31
| @ Golden State
| W 115–92
| Scottie Pippen (32)
| Scottie Pippen (10)
| Michael Jordan (8)
| San Jose Arena18,748
| 40–5

|- style="background:#cfc;"
| 46
| February 2
| @ Seattle
| W 91–84
| Michael Jordan (45)
| Michael Jordan (7)
| Toni Kukoč (9)
| KeyArena17,072
| 41–5
|- style="background:#cfc;"
| 47
| February 4
| @ Portland
| W 88–84
| Michael Jordan (36)
| Scottie Pippen (8)
| Toni Kukoč (5)
| Rose Garden21,538
| 42–5
|- style="background:#fcc;"
| 48
| February 5
| @ L.A. Lakers
| L 90–106
| Michael Jordan (27)
| Toni Kukoč (6)
| Scottie Pippen (9)
| Great Western Forum17,505
| 42–6
|- align="center"
|colspan="9" bgcolor="#bbcaff"|All-Star Break
|- style="background:#cfc;"
|- bgcolor="#bbffbb"
|- style="background:#cfc;"
| 49
| February 11
| Charlotte
| W 103–100
| Michael Jordan (43)
| Dennis Rodman (14)
| Scottie Pippen (7)
| United Center23,884
| 43–6
|- style="background:#cfc;"
| 50
| February 14
| @ Atlanta
| W 89–88
| Michael Jordan (30)
| Dennis Rodman (12)
| Jordan & Pippen (4)
| Omni Coliseum16,378
| 44–6
|- style="background:#cfc;"
| 51
| February 16
| Orlando
| W 110–89
| Scottie Pippen (22)
| Dennis Rodman (13)
| Scottie Pippen (11)
| United Center23,919
| 45–6
|- style="background:#cfc;"
| 52
| February 18
| Denver
| W 134–123
| Scottie Pippen (47)
| Dennis Rodman (13)
| Michael Jordan (12)
| United Center23,874
| 46–6
|- style="background:#cfc;"
| 53
| February 21
| @ Washington
| W 103–99
| Michael Jordan (36)
| Dennis Rodman (12)
| Scottie Pippen (7)
| US Airways Arena18,756
| 47–6
|- style="background:#cfc;"
| 54
| February 22
| Golden State
| W 120–87
| Michael Jordan (34)
| Dennis Rodman (12)
| Harper & Kerr (7)
| United Center23,917
| 48–6
|- style="background:#cfc;"
| 55
| February 24
| Portland
| W 116–89
| Michael Jordan (37)
| Dennis Rodman (15)
| Scottie Pippen (11)
| United Center23,841
| 49–6
|- style="background:#fcc;"
| 56
| February 27
| @ Cleveland
| L 70–73
| Michael Jordan (23)
| Dennis Rodman (16)
| Michael Jordan (4)
| Gund Arena20,562
| 49–7
|- style="background:#cfc;"
| 57
| February 28
| Sacramento
| W 126–108
| Michael Jordan (35)
| Dennis Rodman (11)
| Harper & Jordan (6)
| United Center23,836
| 50–7

|- style="background:#cfc;"
| 58
| March 3
| Milwaukee
| W 108–90
| Michael Jordan (31)
| Dennis Rodman (11)
| Dennis Rodman (7)
| United Center23,894
| 51–7
|- style="background:#cfc;"
| 59
| March 5
| San Antonio
| W 111–69
| Scottie Pippen (19)
| Caffey & Longley (10)
| Randy Brown (8)
| United Center23,841
| 52–7
|- style="background:#cfc;"
| 60
| March 7
| Indiana
| W 104–96
| Michael Jordan (38)
| Dennis Rodman (18)
| Scottie Pippen (9)
| United Center23,902
| 53–7
|- style="background:#fcc;"
| 61
| March 9
| @ New York
| L 93–97
| Michael Jordan (36)
| Dennis Rodman (19)
| Jordan & Pippen (4)
| Madison Square Garden19,763
| 53–8
|- style="background:#cfc;"
| 62
| March 11
| @ Boston
| W 117–106
| Michael Jordan (32)
| Dennis Rodman (16)
| Michael Jordan (9)
| FleetCenter18,624
| 54–8
|- style="background:#cfc;"
| 63
| March 12
| @ Philadelphia
| W 108–104
| Scottie Pippen (31)
| Dennis Rodman (17)
| Scottie Pippen (8)
| CoreStates Center21,061
| 55–8
|- style="background:#fcc;"
| 64
| March 14
| @ New Jersey
| L 98–99
| Michael Jordan (36)
| Dennis Rodman (17)
| Scottie Pippen (9)
| Continental Airlines Arena20,049
| 55–9
|- style="background:#cfc;"
| 65
| March 15
| Atlanta
| W 99–79
| Scottie Pippen (17)
| Dennis Rodman (14)
| Longley & Pippen (7)
| United Center23,984
| 56–9
|- style="background:#cfc;"
| 66
| March 18
| Seattle
| W 89–87 (OT)
| Michael Jordan (32)
| Michael Jordan (18)
| Scottie Pippen (7)
| United Center23,989
| 57–9
|- style="background:#cfc;"
| 67
| March 21
| @ Indiana
| W 117–98
| Michael Jordan (36)
| Dennis Rodman (19)
| Scottie Pippen (8)
| Market Square Arena16,759
| 58–9
|- style="background:#cfc;"
| 68
| March 22
| Detroit
| W 103–88
| Scottie Pippen (26)
| Dennis Rodman (18)
| Michael Jordan (7)
| United Center23,896
| 59–9
|- style="background:#cfc;"
| 69
| March 25
| Dallas
| W 94–92
| Jordan & Kerr (20)
| Dennis Rodman (21)
| Scottie Pippen (6)
| United Center23,854
| 60–9
|- style="background:#cfc;"
| 70
| March 27
| @ Toronto
| W 96–83
| Longley & Pippen (16)
| Michael Jordan (10)
| Scottie Pippen (7)
| SkyDome34,104
| 61–9
|- style="background:#cfc;"
| 71
| March 29
| New Jersey
| W 111–101
| Scottie Pippen (31)
| Scottie Pippen (8)
| Michael Jordan (10)
| United Center23,916
| 62–9

|- style="background:#cfc;"
| 72
| April 1
| Boston
| W 111–106
| Michael Jordan (21)
| Jason Caffey (9)
| Scottie Pippen (7)
| United Center23,906
| 63–9
|- style="background:#fcc;"
| 73
| April 3
| @ Washington
| L 102–110
| Michael Jordan (34)
| Caffey & Kukoč (8)
| Michael Jordan (6)
| US Airways Arena18,756
| 63–10
|- style="background:#cfc;"
| 74
| April 4
| Cleveland
| W 84–71
| Michael Jordan (22)
| Scottie Pippen (7)
| Luc Longley (6)
| United Center23,955
| 64–10
|- style="background:#cfc;"
| 75
| April 6
| @ Orlando
| W 110–94
| Michael Jordan (37)
| Caffey & Jordan (8)
| Michael Jordan (5)
| Orlando Arena17,248
| 65–10
|- style="background:#cfc;"
| 76
| April 7
| Philadelphia
| W 128–102
| Michael Jordan (30)
| Luc Longley (11)
| Ron Harper (7)
| United Center23,618
| 66–10
|- style="background:#cfc;"
| 77
| April 9
| @ Indiana
| W 86–80
| Michael Jordan (23)
| Jason Caffey (16)
| Scottie Pippen (3)
| Market Square Arena16,760
| 67–10
|- style="background:#cfc;"
| 78
| April 10
| @ New York
| W 105–103
| Michael Jordan (34)
| Caffey & Jordan (8)
| Michael Jordan (6)
| Madison Square Garden19,763
| 68–10
|- style="background:#fcc;"
| 79
| April 13
| @ Detroit
| L 91–108
| Scottie Pippen (21)
| Jason Caffey (10)
| Michael Jordan (7)
| The Palace of Auburn Hills21,454
| 68–11
|- style="background:#cfc;"
| 80
| April 14
| Toronto
| W 117–100
| Michael Jordan (30)
| Michael Jordan (11)
| Michael Jordan (10)
| United Center23,896
| 69–11
|- style="background:#fcc;"
| 81
| April 16
| @ Miami
| L 92–102
| Scottie Pippen (28)
| Michael Jordan (8)
| Luc Longley (5)
| Miami Arena15,200
| 69–12
|- style="background:#fcc;"
| 82
| April 19
| New York
| L 101–103
| Michael Jordan (33)
| 3 players tied (6)
| Scottie Pippen (12)
| United Center24,161
| 69–13

Playoffs

|- align="center" bgcolor="#ccffcc"
| 1
| April 25
| Washington
| W 98–86
| Michael Jordan (29)
| Scottie Pippen (10)
| Michael Jordan (8)
| United Center24,122
| 1–0
|- align="center" bgcolor="#ccffcc"
| 2
| April 27
| Washington
| W 109–104
| Michael Jordan (55)
| Scottie Pippen (9)
| Luc Longley (6)
| United Center24,267
| 2–0
|- align="center" bgcolor="#ccffcc"
| 3
| April 30
| @ Washington
| W 96–95
| Michael Jordan (28)
| Dennis Rodman (10)
| Michael Jordan (6)
| US Airways Arena18,756
| 3–0

|- align="center" bgcolor="#ccffcc"
| 1
| May 6
| Atlanta
| W 100–97
| Michael Jordan (34)
| Michael Jordan (11)
| Michael Jordan (6)
| United Center24,397
| 1–0
|- align="center" bgcolor="#ffcccc"
| 2
| May 8
| Atlanta
| L 95–103
| Michael Jordan (27)
| Michael Jordan (16)
| Scottie Pippen (9)
| United Center24,544
| 1–1
|- align="center" bgcolor="#ccffcc"
| 3
| May 10
| @ Atlanta
| W 100–80
| Michael Jordan (21)
| Jason Caffey (11)
| Kukoč & Pippen (5)
| Omni Coliseum16,378
| 2–1
|- align="center" bgcolor="#ccffcc"
| 4
| May 11
| @ Atlanta
| W 89–80
| Michael Jordan (27)
| Jordan & Pippen (8)
| 3 players tied (4)
| Omni Coliseum16,378
| 3–1
|- align="center" bgcolor="#ccffcc"
| 5
| May 13
| Atlanta
| W 107–92
| Michael Jordan (24)
| Dele & Longley (10)
| Jordan & Pippen (7)
| United Center24,544
| 4–1

|- align="center" bgcolor="#ccffcc"
| 1
| May 20
| Miami
| W 84–77
| Michael Jordan (37)
| Dennis Rodman (19)
| Harper & Pippen (4)
| United Center24,544
| 1–0
|- align="center" bgcolor="#ccffcc"
| 2
| May 22
| Miami
| W 75–68
| Jordan & Pippen (23)
| Dennis Rodman (10)
| Ron Harper (6)
| United Center24,544
| 2–0
|- align="center" bgcolor="#ccffcc"
| 3
| May 24
| @ Miami
| W 98–74
| Michael Jordan (34)
| Dennis Rodman (9)
| Toni Kukoč (6)
| Miami Arena14,720
| 3–0
|- align="center" bgcolor="#ffcccc"
| 4
| May 26
| @ Miami
| L 80–87
| Michael Jordan (29)
| Dennis Rodman (11)
| Scottie Pippen (5)
| Miami Arena14,720
| 3–1
|- align="center" bgcolor="#ccffcc"
| 5
| May 28
| Miami
| W 100–87
| Michael Jordan (28)
| Dennis Rodman (13)
| Toni Kukoč (7)
| United Center24,544
| 4–1

|- align="center" bgcolor="#ccffcc"
| 1
| June 1
| Utah
| W 84–82
| Michael Jordan (31)
| Dennis Rodman (12)
| Michael Jordan (8)
| United Center24,544
| 1–0
|- align="center" bgcolor="#ccffcc"
| 2
| June 4
| Utah
| W 97–85
| Michael Jordan (38)
| Michael Jordan (13)
| Michael Jordan (9)
| United Center24,544
| 2–0
|- align="center" bgcolor="#ffcccc"
| 3
| June 6
| @ Utah
| L 93–104
| Scottie Pippen (27)
| Ron Harper (7)
| Michael Jordan (6)
| Delta Center19,911
| 2–1
|- align="center" bgcolor="#ffcccc"
| 4
| June 8
| @ Utah
| L 73–78
| Michael Jordan (22)
| Scottie Pippen (12)
| 3 players tied (4)
| Delta Center19,911
| 2–2
|- align="center" bgcolor="#ccffcc"
| 5
| June 11
| @ Utah
| W 90–88
| Michael Jordan (38)
| Scottie Pippen (10)
| Jordan & Pippen (5)
| Delta Center19,911
| 3–2
|- align="center" bgcolor="#ccffcc"
| 6
| June 13
| Utah
| W 90–86
| Michael Jordan (39)
| Jordan & Rodman (11)
| Michael Jordan (4)
| United Center24,544
| 4–2

Player stats

Regular season

Playoffs

NBA finals

Schedule
 Game 1 – June 1, Sunday   @Chicago, Chicago 84, Utah 82: Chicago leads series 1-0
 Game 2 – June 4, Wednesday   @Chicago, Chicago 97, Utah 85: Chicago leads series 2-0
 Game 3 – June 6, Friday  @Utah, Utah 104, Chicago 93: Chicago leads series 2-1
 Game 4 – June 8, Sunday @Utah,  Utah 78, Chicago 73: Series tied 2-2
 Game 5 – June 11, Wednesday @Utah,  Chicago 90, Utah 88: Chicago leads series 3-2
 Game 6 – June 13, Friday @Chicago,  Chicago 90, Utah 86: Chicago wins series 4-2

The Finals were played using a 2-3-2 site format, where the first two and last two games are held at the team with home court advantage's (Chicago's) home court (United Center).

Game 1
Sunday, June 1, at the United Center

Game 2
Wednesday, June 4, at the United Center

Game 3
Friday, June 6, at the Delta Center

Game 4
Sunday, June 8, at the Delta Center

Game 5: The Flu Game
Wednesday, June 11, at the Delta Center

Game 5, often referred to as "The Flu Game", was one of Michael Jordan's most memorable. Just 24 hours earlier, on June 10, 1997, Michael Jordan woke up nauseated and sweating profusely. He hardly had the strength to sit up in bed and was diagnosed with a stomach virus or food poisoning. The Bulls trainers told Jordan that there was no way he could play in the game. The Jazz had just won two in a row to tie the series, and Chicago needed their leader in this critical swing game. Against all odds, Jordan rose from bed at 3:00 p.m., just in time for the 6:00 tip-off at the Delta Center.

Jordan was visibly weak and pale as he stepped onto the court for Game Five. At first, he displayed no energy whatsoever, and John Stockton, along with reigning MVP Karl Malone, quickly led the Jazz to a 16-point lead. But in the second quarter, Jordan started to sink shots despite lacking his usual explosive speed and hardly being able to concentrate. He scored 17 points in the quarter as the Bulls hit the front before halftime.

Luc Longley and Scottie Pippen did their best to keep the Bulls in the game while Jordan was fatigued again in the third. But Jordan turned it on again, scoring 15 points in the fourth quarter, including a clutch rebound and three-point shot with the game tied and under a minute left that put the Bulls up by three points. Chicago held on for a narrow victory.

Jordan finished the game with 38 points, seven rebounds, five assists, three steals and one block. Malone was the highest-scoring Jazz player with 19 points but suffered from some dreadful shooting. Jordan stayed on the court for 44 minutes, resting for only four minutes while being perpetually at the brink of fainting. With only a few seconds remaining and the game finally at hand, Jordan collapsed into Scottie Pippen's arms.
 Game Recap
 Box Score

Game 6
Friday, June 13, at the United Center

Michael Jordan was not fully recovered from the flu, but was feeling much better and led the Bulls with 39 points. In the third quarter Michael Jordan dunked after a steal, bringing the crowd to its feet. The Bulls trailed by 9 points early in the fourth quarter but went on a 10-0 run to take their first lead since the opening minutes when Steve Kerr hit a 3-pointer, but the Jazz would regain the lead. In the final minutes, Jordan's fadeaway on the baseline put the Bulls up by 3, before Bryon Russell hit a three-pointer to tie the game at 86-86. The two teams would fail to score on their next possessions.  With 28 seconds left after Shandon Anderson missed a reverse layup, the Jazz expected Jordan to take the final shot. Instead, Jordan passed off to Steve Kerr, who hit a shot with 5 seconds left to send the United Center crowd into a frenzy. The Jazz looked for one final shot to stay alive, but Scottie Pippen made a massive defensive play as he knocked away Bryon Russell's inbound pass intended for Shandon Anderson and was able to pass the ball over to Toni Kukoč, who dunked the final 2 points of the game to bring the Finals to an end. Afterwards, Jordan was named the NBA Finals MVP.

Awards and honors
 Scottie Pippen, Forward, NBA's 50th Anniversary All-Time Team
 Michael Jordan, Guard, NBA's 50th Anniversary All-Time Team
 Robert Parish, Center, NBA's 50th Anniversary All-Time Team
 Michael Jordan, All-NBA Team, First Team
 Michael Jordan, Guard, NBA Finals MVP
 Michael Jordan, NBA All-Defensive First Team
 Michael Jordan, Regular season leader, Field Goals (920)
 Michael Jordan, Regular season leader, Field Goal Attempts (1892)
 Michael Jordan, Regular season leader, Total Points (2431)
 Michael Jordan, Regular season leader, Scoring Average (29.6 points per game)
Scottie Pippen, All-NBA Team, Second Team
Scottie Pippen, NBA All-Defensive First Team

NBA All-Star Game
 Michael Jordan, Guard
 Scottie Pippen, Forward

References

External links
 Bulls on Database Basketball
 Bulls on Basketball Reference

Chicago Bulls seasons
Chic
Eastern Conference (NBA) championship seasons
NBA championship seasons
Chicago
Chicago